Nico Jose “Nix” Nolledo is a Filipino digital entrepreneur and co-founder of Xurpas, a mobile content provider company. He also worked for Rappler, the Founding Director of the Internet and Mobile Marketing Association of Philippines and Digital Commerce Association of Philippines (IMAAPDCP).  He is currently the chief executive officer of Open Data Exchange (ODX) Pte. Ltd and the chairman of Xurpas, Inc.

Early life 
Nolledo has a degree of Bachelor of Science in Management from Ateneo de Manila University. Initially, he worked as an Assistant Branch Manager in a Philippine branch of KFC.

Business ventures 
In 1999, Nolledo established PinoyExchange.com with the help of his brother in 1999 as an online community where people can connect and discuss on the basis of their area of interest. In 2001, he founded Xurpas in 2001 bring opportunities for mobile content developers. The company's IPO of P1.36 billion was the most successful and only consumer tech listing in South East Asia at that time.

Investments 
Nolledo is an angel investor in various technology companies and has served on the boards of companies such as Rappler.com, Gurango Software, PurpleClick, Pawnhero and MyRegalo.com.

Awards and recognitions 
Nolledo was recognized as EY's Philippine Entrepreneur of the Year in 2015,   Endeavor Entrepreneur in 2015, and was chosen as the Outstanding Young Men (TOYM) in the Philippines for 2015.

References 

Living people
Filipino business executives
Filipino company founders
Year of birth missing (living people)
Place of birth missing (living people)
Ateneo de Manila University alumni
Angel investors